Rade Veljović (born 9 August 1986) is a Serbian former professional footballer who played as a striker.

Club career
After coming through the youth system at Red Star Belgrade, Veljović played for Jedinstvo Ub (loan), Napredak Kruševac, and Voždovac, before transferring abroad and signing with Romanian side CFR Cluj in the 2009 winter transfer window. He later spent some time on loan at Unirea Alba Iulia, Târgu Mureș, and Borac Banja Luka. In the summer of 2011, Veljović returned to his homeland on loan to Javor Ivanjica. He also played for Smederevo, Voždovac (second spell), and Radnik Surdulica (no appearances), before retiring from the game.

International career
Veljović was selected by Slobodan Krčmarević to represent Serbia at the 2009 UEFA European Under-21 Championship, but failed to make any appearance at the tournament. He previously earned eight caps for the under-21 team.

Honours
Radnik Surdulica
 Serbian First League: 2014–15

References

External links
 
 
 
 

ASA 2013 Târgu Mureș players
Association football forwards
CFR Cluj players
Expatriate footballers in Bosnia and Herzegovina
Expatriate footballers in Romania
CSM Unirea Alba Iulia players
FK Borac Banja Luka players
FK Javor Ivanjica players
FK Jedinstvo Ub players
FK Napredak Kruševac players
FK Radnik Surdulica players
FK Smederevo players
FK Voždovac players
Liga I players
Premier League of Bosnia and Herzegovina players
Red Star Belgrade footballers
Serbia under-21 international footballers
Serbian expatriate footballers
Serbian expatriate sportspeople in Bosnia and Herzegovina
Serbian expatriate sportspeople in Romania
Serbian First League players
Serbian footballers
Serbian SuperLiga players
Footballers from Belgrade
1986 births
Living people